Nelson Atiagli (born 18 January 1996) is a Ghanaian professional footballer who plays as a defender for Italian Eccellenza Lazio club Terracina.

He previously played for Ghanaian club Tema Youth but he left to join Latina U19 ahead of the 2014–15 Campionato Primavera 1 season.

Career

Latina Calcio 
Atiagli moved to Latina in the 2014–15 season but he did not make a senior team appearance until the 2018–19 season when played a total of 15 games for the club in the Serie D Girone G. In the following 2019–20 season, he made a total of 14 appearances for Latina as a midfielder. During a press conference in 2015 General Manager Fabio Napolitano confirmed that Latina had successfully registered Atiagli for the league. In September 2019 the midfielder underwent a surgery at Latina to remove three abdominal hernias.

References 

1996 births
Living people
Footballers from Accra
Ghanaian footballers
Association football defenders
Tema Youth players
Serie C players
Serie D players
Eccellenza players
Latina Calcio 1932 players
Ghanaian expatriate footballers
Ghanaian expatriate sportspeople in Italy
Expatriate footballers in Italy